Laleham is a village on the River Thames, in the  Borough of Spelthorne, about  west of central London, England. Historically part of the county of  Middlesex, it was transferred to Surrey in 1965. Laleham is downriver from Staines-upon-Thames and upriver from Chertsey.

The north of the area has a number of sports fields, including the Staines and Laleham Sports Ground, and two family pubs, one each on the Laleham and Ashford Roads. Laleham Park, by the River Thames, is south of the village.

Two Surrey County Council bus routes serve the village.

The poet Matthew Arnold (1822–88) lived here, dividing his time between Laleham and Rugby School.

History

The toponym "Laleham" comes from lael meaning twig and hamm (land in a river bend) or from Lella's ham (cognate with holm or homestead), meaning farmstead owned by a person named similarly to the first syllable.

There may have been a 1st-century Roman marching camp in the far north, in a field which is now part of Matthew Arnold School.

Iron Age spearheads from the 5th century have been found in the Thames at the point where a ferry used to run. Tenth century charters, see Chertsey Abbey (which long owned the lands surrounding its Abbey across the Thames) record the village/parish as Laelham.

The Middlesex section of the Domesday Book of 1086 records the village as Leleham. The manor was held partly by Fécamp Abbey from Robert of Mortain and by Estrild, the nun; its owner before Norman Conquest there recorded as Aki (the Dane). Middlesex formed the far south of the Danelaw. Its Domesday assets were: 10 hides of land, 6½ ploughs, 5 ploughlands, meadow and cattle pasture. Its villagers and chief tenants rendered £5 per year to its feudal overlords. The manor of Laleham was within a few generations held by Westminster Abbey throughout its monetary heyday.

The Church of England parish church of All Saints dates from the 12th century but was largely rebuilt in brick about 1600 and the present tower was built in 1780. It is a Grade I listed building. The church has a stained glass window by Wilhelmina Geddes. In the 13th century Westminster Abbey records its Laleham grange and watermill on the banks of the Thames near the site of Laleham Manor House (later briefly a Catholic revival 'Abbey'). In 1970 the clustered village centre of Laleham was designated a conservation area.

Today, Laleham has a Church of England primary school, an archery club and Burway Rowing Club.

Buildings
Laleham has 25 listed buildings. Church Farmhouse, next to All Saints' church, is an early 17th-century brick farmhouse with Georgian alterations. It is an example of a central chimney house with a standard layout for such a house. On either side of the central chimney is a living room and the entrance is through a tiled two-storey porch, the stairs filling the space on the opposite side of the chimney. It once housed the Lucan's bailiff. It was sold in 1966 by the profligate 7th Earl. Eight years later he was suspected of the murder of his family nanny in Lower Belgrave Street, London and disappeared.

Laleham Abbey

Designed by J.B. Papworth, the house was wholly rebuilt in 1803–06 as the British country seat of The 2nd Earl of Lucan, an Anglo-Irish peer, and altered, employing Papworth again, in the 1820s and 1830s. It is a Grade II* listed building, the middle classification. Its private demesne (park) spanned , much of which is a public amenity, with riverside refreshments, playgrounds, football areas, fishing, camping and a cross-country circuit. The house is neoclassical with a Doric portico. Inside are marble floors and columns, a semi-circular staircase and a cupola. Maria II of Portugal stayed here for the English part of her tour of three European courts due to Miguel of Portugal's 1826–1834 insurrection. It was for some decades let to the Catholic Church in the early 20th century, acquiring its Abbey status as a Nunnery. The house was divided into apartments in 1981.

Churches

All Saints' Church is an evangelical Anglican Church. It has a hatchment of the Earls of Lucan in the north aisle; east of the vestry in the churchyard is the Lucan gravesite.

Laleham has a Methodist church in Edinburgh Drive. An Elim Pentecostal Church, Kingdom Living Church, also meets at the Methodist church.

Notable people

The poet and critic Matthew Arnold was born in the village and is buried in All Saints' parish churchyard. A local county-supported comprehensive school is named after him. His father Dr Thomas Arnold was headmaster of Rugby School, travelled widely and settled his family in Laleham.

In 1803 Richard Bingham, 2nd Earl of Lucan bought the manor from William Lowther, 1st Earl of Lonsdale. Both Arnold and Lucan family names are prominent in All Saints' parish church, with memorials to various generations of those families. Lord Bingham, 3rd Earl of Lucan (1800–88), the Field Marshal who reluctantly passed on the order for the Charge of the Light Brigade at the Battle of Balaclava in 1854 is buried in the churchyard; along with Charles Bingham, 4th Earl of Lucan, George Bingham, 5th Earl of Lucan and their countesses. One of the village pubs was called the Lucan Arms pub for many years until it was renamed in the late 1990s.

Gabrielle Anwar, actress and star of the Fox television series Burn Notice was born in Laleham and attended Laleham C of E Primary and Middle School 1975–82.

Other notable family names are Buckland and Honor and the four houses at Laleham school are Buckland (Red), Arnold (Blue), Honor (Yellow) and Lucan (Green). The Reverend Andy Buckland was Matthew Arnold's maternal uncle; Buckland primary  School in Staines  was named after him.

The Reynell Baronets, originally from Devon, were substantial landowners at Laleham.

Coal and mining administrator, Alfred Robens, Baron Robens of Woldingham lived with his wife at Laleham Abbey after his retirement in 1982.

Denny Laine, and Steve Holley of the band Wings lived in Laleham in the late 1970s.

Demography and housing

The average level of accommodation in the region composed of detached houses was 28%, the average that was apartments was 22.6%.

The proportion of households in the town who owned their home outright compares to the regional average of 35.1%. The proportion who owned their home with a loan compares to the regional average of 32.5%. The remaining % is made up of rented dwellings (plus a negligible % of households living rent-free).

References

External links

 Laleham-on-Thames Residents' Association

Populated places on the River Thames
Borough of Spelthorne
Villages in Surrey
Places formerly in Middlesex